Roco Urquijo (Madrid, 21 April 1935 – 9 March 2009) was a Spanish artist and first wife of Filipino industrialist Enrique Zobel.

Biography
Urquijo was born to Rosario Novales and Francisco Urquijo. She married the Filipino industrialist and former  of the Ayala Corporation, Enrique Zobel, with who she had two children, Iñigo Zobel and Mercedes Zobel.

Art

Inspiration
Urquijo's works were inspired by the interior design, architecture, and folk arts of Indonesia, Sumatra, Mexico, and various parts of South America and Europe which she encountered during her frequent travels. "Traveling is for me a great stimulus for creativity. I discover something in every culture."  Her geometric designs were inspired by the carved and painted doors that are commonly found in Sumatra and Bali. The series Oaxaca was influenced by the designs of the Maya. "It's the places (I've) seen and the things (I've) experienced", Urquijo says, "that finally make a work of art." 

Urquijo's mixed media works are typically minimal, using strong geometric shapes and a vivid colour palette.

Studies
 1965–1966: Understudy to Lee Aguinaldo, artist, Manila, Philippines
 1968–1969: Understudy to José Hernández, artist, Madrid, Spain
 1969–1970: Print making with Pandy Aviado, artist, Madrid, Spain; Print-Making with Michael Ponce de León, artist, Casa Americana, Madrid, Spain

Exhibitions
Urquijo exhibited in galleries in Spain, Venezuela, New York City, Singapore, the Philippines, Morocco, and Italy. She was recognized as an exceptional and gifted artist of imagination and ingenuity and won numerous art awards in competitions. Her artwork is in many public and private collections worldwide.

Solo exhibitions
 2002: Book launch and signing; Rocio Urquijo, Wally Findlay Galleries, New York, New York
 1998: Nature, Form, Color, Wally Findlay Galleries, Palm Beach, Florida
 1998: Color, City, Door, Philippine Center, New York, New York
 1998: Exposicíon de Pictura, Instituto Cervantes, Milan, Italy
 1997: Patios and Doors, Instituto Cervantes, Manila, Philippines
 1991: Inaguración, Galería Félix, Caracas, Venezuela
 1983: Caesium, Fine Art Gallery, Singapore
 1983: Rocio Urquijo, Luz Gallery, Manila, Philippines
 1981: Drawings of Rocio Urquijo, Hastings Gallery, Queen Sofia Spanish Institute, New York, New York
 1979: Dibujos, Sala de Arte Jamete, Cuenca, Spain
 1971: Información de Turismo, Casa de Cultura, Valencia, Spain
 1970: Exposition Rocio Urquijo, Luz Gallery, Manila, Philippines

Group exhibitions
 2001: The Art of Holiday Giving, Wally Findlay Galleries, New York, New York
 1999: Inaugural East Hampton Exhibition, Wally Findlay Galleries, East Hampton, New York
 1998: Women of Vision, Wally Findlay Galleries, Palm Beach, Florida
 1996: Poesía Visual y Experimental, Casa del Teatro, Santa Domingo, Dominican Republic
 1986: Inaguración, Sala Caniego, Mohedas de Granadilla, Spain
 1985: Reenencuentro Hispano Puertorriqueño, Aula de la Columbia, Universidad de Salamanca, Salamanca, Spain
 1985: Artistas de la Ciudad Encantatda, Casa de la Cultura, Cuenca, Spain
 1985: Artistas Hispano-Americanos en Madrid, Lonja de la Casa del Reloj, Araganzuela, Madrid, Spain
 1985: Artistas Hispano-Puertorriqueño de Artes Plasticas, Museo de la Universidad de Puerto Rico, Rio Piedras, Puerto Rico
 1985: 1a Body Space Muestra de Grabado, Ciudad de Alarcón, Madrid, Spain
 1983: I Bienal Hispanoamericana de Dibujo y Grabado, Casa de la Entrevista, Alcalá de Henares, Spain
 1983: I Bienal de Pintura y Escultura, Universidad Politécnica de Madrid, Madrid, Spain
 1970: II Print Bienale, Kraków, Poland
 1970: Becados del Washington Irving Institute, Madrid, Spain
 1970: Eros 70, Galeria Vandres, Madrid, Spain
 1969: ABU Group: BenCab, Pandy Aviado, Rocio Urquijo, Sala Honda, Cuenca, Spain

Awards
 1970: 1st Prize, Etching, II Print Bienale, Kraków, Poland
 1971: 1st Prize, Etching, Información de Turisimo, Valencia, Spain
 1972: 1st Prize, Etching, Becados del Washington Irving Institute, Madrid, Spain

References

External links
 

1935 births
2009 deaths
Spanish artists
Zobel de Ayala family